"Treetrunk" is a song by American rock band the Doors. Recorded and released in 1972, "Treetrunk" was recorded by the surviving members of the Doors as they assembled material for their second and final album as a threesome, Full Circle, following the death of Jim Morrison. "Treetrunk" was released as a B-side of the "Get Up and Dance" single released by Elektra Records in July 1972.

Non-album track
"Treetrunk" is one of only three non-album B-sides to be released by the Doors. The other two are "Who Scared You?" (the B-side of "Wishful Sinful", issued on Elektra in May 1969) and "(You Need Meat) Don't Go No Further" (the B-side of "Love Her Madly" on Elektra in March 1971), both of which appeared on the compilation album Weird Scenes Inside the Gold Mine.

Releases
Songwriter Robby Krieger felt "it sounded too commercial", and the track was left off the album.

Until 2013, the only official commercial release of "Treetrunk" was the original 1972 vinyl single. As a result, it was one of the rarest and least known songs by the Doors. The song has since been given an official reissue as part of the Japan-only Singles Box box set in 2013; as a bonus track on the official 2-CD remastered reissue of the Other Voices and Full Circle albums in 2015; and again on the remastered compilation The Singles in 2017.

Personnel
 Ray Manzarekkeyboards, lead vocals
 Robby Kriegerguitar, vocals
 John Densmoredrums
 Jack Conradbass

References

1972 songs
1972 singles
The Doors songs
Songs written by Robby Krieger